The Abbott Memorial Library is the public library serving the village of South Pomfret, Vermont.  It is located at 15 Library Street, in an architecturally distinguished building constructed in 1905 through a bequest of the local Abbott family.  The building was listed on the National Register of Historic Places in 2015.

Services
The Abbott Memorial Library circulating collection includes books and media, and is part of the state's interlibrary loan service.  Internet service is available at the library, and it has a meeting space available for community use.

Architecture and history
The Abbott Memorial Library is located in the center of South Pomfret village, at the northwest corner of Library and Stage Streets.  It is a single-story masonry structure, built out of brick and stone, set on a raised fieldstone foundation.  It is covered by a terra cotta hip roof, with decorations at the crest, as well as at the crests of its hip dormers and the gabled entrance portico.  Windows are sash, with the upper sashes having patterned glazing.  The entrance portico is supported by paired Tuscan columns, which support an entablature and a gable with a half-round window in it.

The library was funded through a bequest made in 1903 by Ira Abbott, a prominent local attorney, which supported the acquisition of the land and the construction of the building.  The library has had state accreditation since 1999, and is funded by a combination of public and private funding.  It is overseen by a board of trustees.

See also
National Register of Historic Places listings in Windsor County, Vermont

References

External links
Abbott Memorial Library web site

Library buildings completed in 1905
Buildings and structures in Pomfret, Vermont
Libraries on the National Register of Historic Places in Vermont
Queen Anne architecture in Vermont
National Register of Historic Places in Windsor County, Vermont
1903 establishments in Vermont
Public libraries in Vermont
Libraries in Vermont